Many railroads ran trains named Fast Mail, including: 
 Fast Mail (Amtrak train) – Amtrak
 Fast Mail (C&NW train) – Chicago & North Western
 Fast Mail (CB&Q train) - Chicago, Burlington and Quincy Railroad
 Fast Mail (Great Northern) – Great Northern Railway (U.S.)
 Fast Mail (MC train) - Michigan Central Railroad
 Fast Mail (Milwaukee Road) – Chicago, Milwaukee, St. Paul and Pacific Railroad
 Fast Mail (NYC train) – New York Central Railroad
 Fast Mail (Southern Railway) - Southern Railway (U.S.) had a Fast Mail train more famously known as "Old 97" which was in the Wreck of the Old 97 in 1903.

See also
 The Fast Mail, a 1922 American silent film